A dry valley is a valley which holds no water.

Dry valley or Dry Valley may also refer to:

Dry Valley, Nevada, a community in the United States
Dry Valley (novel), a novel by Ivan Bunin
Dry Valley (Reynolds County, Missouri), a valley in Missouri
McMurdo Dry Valleys in Antarctica, some of the driest places on Earth